Alexander Park may refer to:

 Alexander Park (Saint Petersburg), a park in Saint Petersburg, Russia
 Alexander Park (Tsarskoye Selo), a park in Tsarskoye Selo, Russia
 Alexander Park (Columbus, Ohio), United States
 Alexander Park (politician) (1808–1873),Australian politician

See also
 Viscount Alexander Park, a neighbourhood in Ottawa, Ontario, Canada
 Alexander Parker (disambiguation)
 Alexander Parkes (1813–1890), English metallurgist
 Alexandra Park (disambiguation)
 Alex Parks (born 1984), English singer-songwriter
 Alexander Garden